Schramm is a German surname. Notable people with the surname include:

Acting 
 David Schramm (actor) (1946-2020), played Roy Biggins in the TV series Wings
 Ernst Gerold Schramm (1938–2004), German baritone
 Günther Schramm (born 1929), German actor
 Karla Schramm (1891–1980), American actress 
 Marie-Luise Schramm (born 1984), German actress
 Paula Schramm (born 1989), German actress

Art and music
 Dave Schramm (musician), former lead guitarist for Yo La Tengo
 Felix Schramm (born 1970), German artist
 Georg Schramm (born 1949), German psychologist and Kabarett artist
 Margit Schramm (1935–1996), German soprano in operetta, opera and song
 Werner Schramm (1898–1970), German painter

Business
 Buford John "B.J." Schramm (1938–2004), American businessman and developer of light personal helicopters
 Carl Schramm, American businessman

Mathematics and science 
 David Schramm (astrophysicist) (1945–1997), American expert on the big bang theory and dark matter
 Jacob R. Schramm (1885–1976), American botanist
 Oded Schramm (1961–2008), Israeli-American mathematician
 Vern L. Schramm (born 1941), American biochemist and professor at Albert Einstein College of Medicine

Politics
 Bill Schramm (1886–1962), New Zealand politician
 Hilde Schramm (born 1936), former leader of the German Green Party

Sport
 Beate Schramm (born 1966), German rower
 Claudia Schramm (born 1975), German bobsledder
 Dave Schramm (American football) (born 1963), American college football player and assistant coach
 Norbert Schramm (born 1960), German figure skater
 Ricky Schramm (born 1985), American soccer player
 Tex Schramm (1920–2003), American president and manager of the Dallas Cowboys football team

Other
 Augustin Schramm (1907–1948), German-Czech intelligence agent
 Gert Schramm (1928–2016), German African-American concentration camp survivor
 Jean-Paul, comte de Schramm (1789–1884), French general
 Percy Ernst Schramm (1894–1970), German historian of the Holy Roman Empire
 Peter W. Schramm (born 1946), American academic at Ashland University
 Wilbur Schramm (1907–1987), American communications researcher

See also
 Schram (disambiguation), in some cases an alternative spelling

German-language surnames
Surnames from nicknames